Raja Club Athletic (Arabic: نادي الرجاء الرياضي, romanized: Nādī ar-Rajāʾ ar-Riyāḍī) is a professional sports club based in Casablanca, Morocco. The club was founded on 20 March 1949 in Derb Sultan by a group of Moroccan nationalists and trade unionists, including , the team's first coach, and Maati Bouabid, future Prime Minister and Minister of Justice, who regarded football as a way of resistance against the French colonizer, and wanted to join the sporting clubs of Casablanca. For more than a year, Raja only played friendly matches before receiving affiliation to Ligue du Maroc de Football Association at the start of the 1950–51 season, earning the right to join the national football leagues.

In 1950, composed of only Moroccan players, Raja began its journey from the lowest tier of the national football structure, and came at the top of the 4th division (Groupe Chaouia-Nord). The team played in the 1st Division (3rd tier) for a single season, finishing second of the 1951-52 edition and earning promotion to the Pré-honneur Division (second tier) where it would play for three seasons before sports competitions were boycotted then stopped in 1955. The following year, Raja will dominate the play-offs and established itself as one of the founding members of Botola under the newly created Royal Moroccan Football Federation, and played the first edition that debuted on 15 November 1956. Since this day, Raja is one of only three clubs never to have been relegated from the top tier of Moroccan football, the others being Wydad AC and AS FAR.

After the usurped 1959-60 Botola, Raja struggled to recover and lost two Throne Cup finals in 1965 and 1968. The first two trophies were gained in 1974 and 1977 and the team reached Botola podium five consecutive times between 1972 and 1977, but failed to win the title. This period is marked by players such as Abdelmajid Dolmy, Petchou, Houmane Jarir and Said Ghandi. The following decade was up and down but led to the first Botola title and the 1989 African Champion Clubs' Cup.

In the 1990s, Raja established its supremacy on national football by winning six consecutive leagues, and in Africa by gaining many titles in Champions League, African Super Cup and Afro-Asian Cup. In 2000, Raja was the first Arab and African team to qualify for the Club World Cup. This successful period is closely associated with players like Mustapha Moustawdae, Abdellatif Jrindou, Mustapha Khalif or Mustapha Chadli and managers like Vahid Halilhodžić and Oscar Fulloné who still remain the most successful in the club's history. The 2000s were marked by sporting instability mainly caused by the sale of key players to Europe or to The Gulf and the frequent manager changes. Nevertheless, the club won several national titles: 2003 CAF Cup, 2006 Arab Champions League and lost the 2002 Champions League final. After the 2013 Club World Cup final, Mohamed Boudrika's poor management dragged the club into a big financial crisis and caused setbacks in the league and the Champions League. His successor Said Hasbane did not improve the club's situation and resigned due to popular pressure in 2018. New president Jawad Ziyat got the ball rolling financially and Raja managed to win its first African title in fifteen years. and his first Botola in seven years.

This list details the club's competitive performance and achievements for each season, and provides statistics and top scorers for national and international competitions.

Key

Table headers
Pos = Final position
Pld = Matches played
W = Matches won
D = Matches drawn
L = Matches lost
GF = Goals for
GA = Goals against
Pts = Points

Divisions

Results and rounds
  or   =  Champion or Winner
  or  = Runner-up
  = 3rd position
 SF = Semi-finals
 QF = Quarter-finals
 GS = Group stage
 R1 / R2 / R3 = First, second and third round
 R16 / R32 = Round of 16 and 32
 PR = Preliminary round

Seasons 
This list is updated as of 12 February 2022. Ongoing competitions are shown in italics.

Notes

References

External links
 

Seasons
Seasons
Raja CA seasons
Raja CA